Henrik Langaas Skogvold (born 14 July 2004) is a Norwegian football midfielder who plays for Lillestrøm SK.

He played youth football for Lillestrøm SK. He made his senior debut in the 2021 Norwegian Football Cup against Fu/Vo, and his Eliteserien debut in August 2021 against Haugesund. In the same year he made his debut as a Norway youth international.

References

2004 births
Living people
People from Skedsmo
Norwegian footballers
Norway youth international footballers
Lillestrøm SK players
Eliteserien players
Association football midfielders
Sportspeople from Viken (county)